The 2016 USA Indoor Track and Field Championships was held at the Oregon Convention Center in Portland, Oregon. Organised by USA Track and Field (USATF), the two-day competition took place from March 11 to March 12 and served as the national championships in track and field for the United States.  The meet serves for the selection of American representatives at the 2016 IAAF World Indoor Championships to be held in the same facility one week later.

Men

Women

References

Complete Results (130 kB)

External links
Official USATF website

2016
Track and field indoor
USA Indoor Track and Field Championships
USA Indoor Track and Field Championships
Sports in Portland, Oregon
Track and field in Oregon